Chagatai may refer to:

 Chagatai Khan, the second son of Genghis Khan
 Chagatai Khanate, an area of the Mongol Empire initially ruled by Chagatai Khan
 Chagatai Khans, leaders of the Chagatai khanate from 1227 to 1687, see List of Chagatai Khans
 Chagatai language, an extinct Turkic language once widely spoken in central Asia
 Chagatai people, also known as Chagatai Tajiks.  The origin of the people is unknown, though the name is from Chagatai Khan
 Chughtai, a family name in Asia and the Middle East

See also
 Chagatai Turks (disambiguation)
 Çağatay, a Turkish  name
 Joghatai, a municipality in Razavi Khorasan, Iran
 Jaghatu (disambiguation), Afghanistan.

Language and nationality disambiguation pages